The 2000–01 Men's EuroFloorball Cup Finals took place in Gothenburg, Sweden from 4 to 8 January 2001. Helsingfors IFK won the EuroFloorball Cup after defeating Haninge IBK 2–0.

The tournament was known as the 2000–01 Men's European Cup, but due to name implications, is now known as the 2000–01 Men's EuroFloorball Cup.

Championship results

Preliminary round

Conference A

Conference B

Playoffs

Semi-finals

Bronze-medal match

Championship Match

Placement round

7th-place match

5th-place match

Standings

See also
2000–01 Men's EuroFloorball Cup qualifying

External links
Standings & Statistics

EuroFloorball Cup
2001 in floorball
2001 in Swedish sport